Turkmenistan State News Agency (in ), sometimes shortened to TDH, is the state-owned news agency in Turkmenistan. TDH headquarters are in Bitarap Turkmenistan Avenue, Ashgabat. The agency publishes news and analysis of the socio-political, socio-economic, cultural and sporting life of the state in Turkmen, Russian and English languages. Agency specialists are engaged in the development, technical and information support, and promotion of web sites relating to the culture of Turkmenistan. The current editor-in-chief of TDH is Bekdurdy Amansaryev  Two small, private news agencies, Infoabad and Arzuw, also exist.

History 
Telegraph Agency of Turkmenistan was opened in 1924, shortly after the declaration of Ashgabat as the capital of the Turkmen SSR. In 1925 it was renamed to the Turkmen Telegraph Agency (TurkmenTAG) with the status of a republican organ of the Telegraph Agency of the Soviet Union (TASS). In the mid-1970s, it was renamed to the Turkmeninform News Agency. 

TDH was established in 1991 in independent Turkmenistan. In 1992, it was renamed the State News Agency Turkmen-Press simultaneously with the separation from the TASS structure.

On May 4, 2000, it was renamed into the Turkmen State Information Service Turkmendovlethabarlary.

In November 2013, TDH launched a redesigned website which provides the function of Turkmen TV streaming. This project has been jointly prepared by the Ministry of Communications and is the only one in Turkmenistan.

On November 20, 2014 it was renamed the State News Agency of Turkmenistan (TDH).

Directors of TDH

References

External links
TDH 
TDH 
TDH 

News agencies based in Turkmenistan
1991 establishments in Turkmenistan
Streaming television